La Blanche may refer to:

 Collection Blanche, classic French literature collection
 Lac La Blanche, a lake in Quebec
 "La Blanche", a song on Le Retour de Gérard Lambert, 1981 album by Renaud

See also
 Blanche (disambiguation) 
 Le Blanc (disambiguation)